This is a list of episodes of the British television programme Sugar Rush, broadcast by Channel 4 from 2005 to 2006. There have been 2 series of the programme, the first airing in 2005 and the second in 2006. Each series consists of ten episodes, each 30 minutes long, including adverts. Episodes do not have individual titles.

Series 1 (2005) 
The first series consists of ten episodes and follows a 15-year-old Kim's unrequited crush on Sugar.

Episode 1 
The first episode starts with Kim and Sugar on the waltzers on Brighton Pier. Slowly, Sugar moves in to kiss Kim. The scene then suddenly moves to Kim in bed, under a duvet with her eyes closed, and the sound of whirring. The door knocks, and she suddenly jumps up, and the whirring stops. The whirring was an electric toothbrush she was using to "masturbate about her best friend". She quickly hides the toothbrush under some magazines before her dad comes in, and he tells her that she'll 'go blind'....reading without the lights on.

Viewers are then taken to the time when Kim moved into the house, and she says that her family moved from London the previous week so that they could get away from the filth of London and spend more family time together. Viewers are introduced to the family and the neighbours, gay couple Dave and David. They recommend a handyman that Nathan and Stella should hire to fix up their house, saying something to suggest that he might be gay.

Kim then speaks of how she met Maria Sweet, otherwise known as Sugar. She says how she is sexually obsessed with her, but Sugar is straight, and doesn't know that Kim has feelings for her. Kim was standing outside a clothes shop when she first met Sugar; Sugar ran out of the shop after setting off the security alarms. As she ran past Kim, Sugar stuffed her bag with stolen clothes, and ran off.

Now back in reality again, on her way to school, Kim wonders how she knows she's gay if she's never had sex with a man. As she's thinking this, a male student she walks past starts flirting with her, to which she replies, "Die". He responds with "Dyke". As the scene changes to Sugar and Kim in the school's toilets, Kim says to Sugar that she wants to have sex, before quickly adding 'with a man'. Sugar thinks that Kim has a crush on a guy, oblivious to the fact it is her that Kim is in love with.

Later, when Kim is at home, she meets Dale the handyman, who Stella is perving over. Kim quickly goes to her bedroom where she calls Sugar and tells her about him. She is then invited to her flat, so that she can get tips on flirting with men. On entering Sugar's bedroom, Kim is told to strip, and that few men would be attracted to her in the clothes she's wearing. Kim and Sugar get drunk, and then start trying on clothes. Sugar throws Kim onto her bed, climbs on top of her, and tells Kim to flirt with her, pretending that she is Dale. Kim, getting sexually aroused, says that she must go home and leaves.

When Kim gets back to her house, she says that trying to sleep with Dale isn't the most important thing in the world for her anymore, being displaced by Sugar. As she enters the house, she hears loud banging and assumes it's Dale doing more work. As she gets closer to the kitchen, she hears moaning, and as she opens the door, she finds Stella bent over the kitchen table having sex with Dale. They are finally alerted to Kim's presence when she drops her keys in shock. She quickly runs out of her house, followed down the street by Stella, who tries to justify what she did by saying that nobody is perfect. Kim then runs away.

Later, back at home, Kim leaves the dinner table saying that she is going to be sick when things that everybody says, such as toad in the hole, are interpreted as a sexual innuendo. She goes to her bedroom so she can call Sugar, but is stopped by the doorbell. Hoping it is Sugar, she opens the door, but instead is greeted by Tom, the adopted son of Dave and David. Kim invites him into her house, despite the fact that she doesn't like him and they don't have anything to talk about. He kisses Kim, quickly saying afterwards that he isn't queer, before leaving to go to the bathroom. While Tom is in the bathroom trying to do something about his bad breath, assuming this is why Kim didn't enjoy the kiss, Kim leaves the house to meet up with Sugar at a club. Sugar tries – and fails – to cheer Kim up by saying that her mother has good taste in men if she's willing to have an affair with Dale, and then introduces her to Daz and "The Donkey", who by her admission is the worst DJ in Brighton. While Sugar gets intimate with Daz, Kim sits next to 'The Donkey'.

Meanwhile, Nathan is massaging Stella's feet, commenting on the fact that Kim is acting strangely, not knowing that this is because of Kim's discovery of Stella's affair with Dale. He says that she hasn't been calling him Dad, before Stella reminds him that they've never asked the children to call them mum and dad, but instead Stella and Nathan. For a brief moment, he wonders if Kim hates them.

Kim, frustrated at having to watch Sugar hook up with a man, goes to the toilets to think. When she comes out of her thirty-minute daydream, she notices Sugar has come looking for her, and when she finds her, she goes into the cubicle next to Kim's so that she can climb over, as Kim had locked the door. After telling Kim how her dad used to sleep around, Sugar gets out a marker pen and draws her foot on the cubicle wall. She then gets Kim's foot, and draws around hers. Sugar advises that Kim gets drunk and forgets about her problems, and tells her that when she lost her virginity, she was too drunk at the time to remember anything about it. When Kim leaves the club, she starts crying as she walks home. Once there, she checks on her brother before going to her room, but stops as she sees Stella in her bedroom talking and laughing on the phone with who is assumed to be Dale. Nathan goes to Kim's room with food, and as he asks if something is wrong – Kim addresses him as Dad. He leaves Kim's bedroom happy, thinking that she is okay.

Episode 2 
Kim starts the second episode by saying how life is never how you want it to be. Whilst she's in her bedroom getting ready to go out, Stella comes in and tries to play nice with her in an attempt to keep Kim from telling Nathan that she is having an affair with Dale the handyman. She sprays some of Kim's perfume on herself, uses the lip-gloss that Kim has in her hand, and asks if she can borrow some jeans. Sugar tells Kim that she should get revenge on her mother. Kim tries to thwart Stella's plans of meeting Dale by telling Nathan that she was planning to take the family bowling. Nathan is happy at the thought of going, but reminds Stella and Kim that they can't go as they have to go to a parents evening at Kim's school.

At the school, Kim's teacher asks Kim's parents how they think Kim is settling in, to which they reply that she is settling in fine. At this point, viewers are shown Kim with Sugar, drinking vodka and trying to think of ways to annoy Stella. Kim's teacher then asks if her parents think that moving may have disrupted Kim's life, and Stella says no. The teacher says that she thinks Kim is distracted, as though she's worried about something. Stella tries to defend Kim for her own sake by saying that she's probably fine.

Kim is telling Sugar that she's horrified at the fact that Stella wants to have a "mother and daughter day", but Sugar is excited to hear of it when she's told that Stella invited her to come with them. Stella and Sugar are enjoying the spa, but Kim isn't. At the end of the session, Stella leaves her credit card on a table as she and Sugar drink more alcohol and discuss the affair. Kim tells Stella to end the affair with Dale if she really loves her father, but Stella is trying to blame her for having the affair on Nathan. Kim walks out, and is followed by Sugar shouting her name down the street. Kim asks if Sugar knows what's wrong, and Sugar can't answer, so she carries on walking away. Sugar runs up to Kim, and Kim asks why she was being so nice to Stella after she knew everything that had gone on, and Sugar asked if Kim wanted revenge or not. Kim answers yes, and Sugar then pulled Stella's credit card out of her back pocket. They enter a shop and pick up a lot of clothes, and as Kim is saying how nothing can get in their way, they go to the counter to pay for the goods with Stella's card, only to realise that the shop has installed a Chip and PIN terminal. After Sugar hesitates, Kim grabs the machine keypad from Sugar and keys in the PIN, the display reading "Sale complete". They then go to other various shops and buy more clothes and shoes, and Sugar orders a crate of alcopops with her mobile phone.

Back at Sugar's flat, Kim realises that Sugar only wants Kim for her mother's credit card after Sugar asks if she can leave it when she goes home. Kim then gets angry at Sugar, and tells her that she won't continue being her lapdog. When Kim returns home, she finds Stella and Dale in the front room about to have sex, but quickly acts natural when they hear Nathan and Matt come back. Kim has a daydream about her telling Nathan that Stella and Dale are having an affair, but what really happens is quite the opposite - Kim lies for her mother by saying that she was trying on Kim's new clothes. When Stella speaks to Kim about it later, Kim is crying about having lied about the affair, saying that she wants the family to be how they were and that she doesn't want Nathan and Stella to split up. Stella says they won't split up, but then adds that this would only happen if Nathan didn't find out about the affair.

Kim later meets up with Sugar at the club, who is getting off with Ray the doorman. When sarcastically asked if she wants to watch them making out, Kim says no, but after turning around, she turns back.

Episode 3 
Kim opens the bathroom cabinet and looks at all the pills that are in there, then leaves for school. It's Nathan and Stella's fifteenth wedding anniversary, and Stella is still continuing her affair with Dale.

Sugar sits in some chewing gum and it sticks to her knickers under her short skirt, so she and Kim go to the toilets, where she throws her knickers into the bin before walking out. Kim waits by the sinks, and some other girls come in and talk about a girl who got date raped. The girls leave, and Kim takes Sugar's knickers from the bin, putting them into her bag. Kim then watches Sugar on a trampoline in her short skirt, still with Sugar's knickers hidden in her bag, and a group of boys take pictures of Sugar as her skirt lifts up as she jumps.

Kim, back at home, is back in the bathroom looking at the drugs in the cabinet, and starts to consider date-raping Sugar; and because of the amount of drugs there, and because of what Sugar said about always being too drunk to remember having sex with anybody, Kim believes it will be perfectly okay. Kim moves to the kitchen to look for drugs, and is caught by Stella. She doesn't know why Kim is looking for drugs, so moves to make herself an alcoholic drink. Nathan comes home, and Kim goes upstairs. Stella says that she has an appointment at the hairdressers. Nathan takes blue paint up to Matt's room, who fills an old margarine tub with it. He then paints a doll blue and dunks his pet hamster in the paint.

Nathan drives Stella part-way to the hairdressers so that she can secretly go to a hotel room with Dale, where they have sex. During the sex, Stella worries that Kim might have found contraceptive pills that she is taking, which worries her because Nathan has had a vasectomy. Stella then convinces herself that Kim is trying to commit suicide by taking an overdose, and she quickly leaves to go home. Dale then orders a pornographic movie on the hotel pay channel to relieve his sexual frustration.

Kim walks down the street, and is followed by Tom. He tries to ask her out, but he again blunders by nervously stating that he is not queer.

Kim, back at home, pops the pills out of the packaging and into a box, before she is interrupted by Stella, who wants "talk". Stella confronts Kim about the pills that are missing, and tries to get Kim to tell her what's happening. Kim tells her that they're for a domestic dangers project for school, but from Stella's reaction, she doesn't believe her. She asks if she'd do anything stupid, but Kim doesn't give her a yes or no answer. Stella and Nathan then leave to attend their anniversary dinner. At this point Matt has painted himself in blue. Kim is now having doubts about date-raping Sugar, but leaves a handful of pills on a table nevertheless whilst she looks for alcohol. Sugar's at the door, and she has in one hand a bottle of wine, a pizza in the other. Kim puts the pizza on the table, on top of the pills; and when Sugar goes to pick up the pizza she is surprised to see the medication there. Kim leaves through the back door for a moment, and when she returns, the pills are gone. She sees Sugar not moving on the sofa, with her eyes closed, and thinks she has taken the pills and lost consciousness. She runs towards Sugar, and places her hands on her breasts, asking her to breathe. Sugar then exhales cigarette smoke in Kim's face and removes an earphone from her ear, wondering why Kim's hands are on her breasts. A thud is then heard in the corridor, and as Nathan and Stella come through the front door, they find Matt unconscious on the floor. Kim tells Sugar the following day that Matt's stomach was pumped at the hospital, and that he took the pills because he thought they were 'space-food'.

Stella and Nathan are worried about both of their children now, so they take Matt to a psychologist. Sugar offers to let Kim stay at her flat for a while, to take a bit of stress off the rest of Kim's family. They agree to sleep in the same bed, facing opposite ends. Before Kim and Sugar go to sleep, Kim finds out that Sugar takes sleeping pills anyway, as she can't sleep without them. She then disappears underneath the covers.

Episode 4 
The family are at the beach, but it's cold and raining. Nathan and Matt are wearing SCUBA equipment, and Stella and Kim are in the car. Kim goes to Sugar's house, planning to tell her either that she loves her or that they can no longer be friends. What actually happens, is Sugar opens the door in her underwear, with cream around her pubic area. Kim goes in, and Sugar tells her that she has pubic lice, but doesn't know who she got them off.

Kim goes home and after finding out how pubic lice can be passed on, she realises she herself has them. At the dining table, Kim sees Stella wearing her jeans, without her permission. Later, Kim is putting clothes and her teddy bear in the washing machine. Stella's told Nathan that she's gone out to help a friend whose mother recently died, and Nathan believes this, much to the disappointment of Kim.

Meanwhile, Stella and Dale, after fighting to get Kim's jeans off, discover that they both have pubic lice as well. As Nathan has stayed faithful to Stella, and as Dale is the only other person Stella has had sex with, she assumes the lice are from him. Back at home, Stella also puts her clothes in the washing machine. Kim is now convinced that she gave her mother the lice, and they both use lice shampoo. It is when Nathan and they are sitting together in the living room, he points out a smell, and they both reply, "hair remover", as Stella thinks she has passed the lice onto Kim. She goes to Kim's bedroom and tries to explain this to her, trying to get close to her, but Kim manipulates the situation by telling Stella to stop borrowing her clothes, and to end the affair with Dale if they don't want Nathan to find out.

Kim and Matt wake up in the middle of the night because of Stella and Nathan's arguing. Nathan is trying to confront Stella about the pubic lice he's now got, and he tells Stella that he hasn't had sex with anybody other than her for eighteen years. Stella then admits to Nathan that she's been sleeping with Dale. Kim goes to see Sugar, and cries on her doorstep. She later says how Sugar's crabs put her family in crisis, and then shows signs that she may still be infected. Sugar tells Kim to take her clothes off so that she can put the lice-killing cream on her.

Episode 5 
Nathan says that he doesn't want Stella in the house anymore, and that he doesn't care where she goes.

Kim is introduced to Sugar's new boyfriend Guillaume, who is a Frenchman in England as a language student that doesn't speak any English. Sugar can't speak any French, so there's a language barrier between the two of them that Sugar wants Kim to bridge.

Stella has moved in with Dale, but points out that his house is a mess. Despite Stella's recent breakup, she still continues the affair with Dale.

Kim is angry that nobody is listening to her, and leaves Sugar and her boyfriend alone. When asked who's going to translate for her, Kim tells Sugar to "fuck off" in French.

Sugar calls Kim during the night to ask how to say cunnilingus in French, and Kim says she doesn't know. She later realises that she can have Sugar to herself again if she gets Sugar to leave Guilliaume, or if Guilliaume leaves her; so she calls Sugar back and tells her how to say that she wants anal sex in French, but doesn't tell her this.

Kim wakes up the next morning and goes downstairs to find that Nathan has been sawing at the kitchen table's legs to get it even, and it is now at foot level.

Meeting up with Sugar at the fair, Sugar tells Kim that she didn't quite get what she was expecting the night before, but it was still good. Kim is disappointed to hear that Sugar enjoyed herself with Guillaume, but then thinks of another way to split them up. Kim starts deliberately mis-translating what Sugar and Guillaume are saying to each other, telling Sugar that he wants to leave when he said he wanted to stay, and telling him that Sugar wanted him to leave when she asked Kim to try to get him to stay.

Sugar starts wondering why Guillaume wanted to leave, and Matt tells her that Kim told him that Sugar needed some alone time. They all go in Kim's house, and they find Nathan sleeping on what was the kitchen table. Sugar and Kim move him to the sofa, and they speak about Sugar and Guillaume. Sugar says she'll forgive Kim if she can get her one more night with Guillaume. Kim meets up with Guillaume, and gives him a load of reasons to meet up with her again. That he apparently didn't give Sugar an orgasm, although according to Sugar, he did, is what makes him go back to her one more time before he leaves in 48 hours.

Kim goes to Dale's flat to speak to Stella, and she wants her to come back home. At Dale's house, Stella is cleaning and cooking, doing things that she didn't do while she was living with Nathan. She is under the impression that her family are better off without her living with them, but Kim objects. Kim goes back home without Stella, and Nathan is getting back to normal. When Nathan asks how Stella was, Kim lies and says that she is miserable at Dale's, and that she'll be back living with them soon.

Guilliame is about to board the coach to go back home, but Sugar doesn't want him to leave. He calls her "my little whore" in French, but Kim deliberately mis-translates it as "my little angel" to avoid upsetting Sugar. After he boards the coach and sits at the back, Sugar asks what else he said, and Kim says that he said he loves her; and that he'd like to see two women kissing. Sugar then pulls Kim towards her and kisses her, leaving Guilliame stunned as his coach drives away.

Episode 6 
Kim is in a happy mood after finally getting what she wanted. She even says morning to Tom. When Kim gets to Sugar's flat, she sees Sugar packing her stuff in a bag, preparing to go to Paris to see Guillaume. She thinks that he loves her because of Kim's deliberate manipulation of the situation.

Stella gets a box delivered to her that has written on it "Happy Birthday, Whore". It is the rest of her belongings, that she didn't get from home.

As Sugar's about to get on the coach so that she can go to France, Kim tries to confess about deliberately telling her lies. Sugar doesn't believe her until Kim tells her to look up a word in the dictionary that she stole. After realising that he doesn't love her, Sugar returns home, with Kim carrying the suitcase. Sugar and Kim go to the club and find Tom there. Kim and Sugar sit together, and Tom is sitting at the other side of the bar watching them.

In the bathroom, Sugar speaks about why things go so wrong for her, and Kim tells her that perhaps she's looking in the wrong place for romance, at the same time subtly flirting with her. Sugar says that she's looking for somebody to fuck, not somebody to love. After finally giving up on the fact that Sugar doesn't have feelings for her, Kim walks away and sits on a fairground ride on her own, thinking.

After getting off the ride, Kim decides, again, that it's time she told Sugar how she feels. She goes to Sugar's bedroom, and speaks to a body underneath her bed sheets. She goes on to say that she loves her, but then Sugar comes into the bedroom through the door. Under the sheets is Tom.

Kim wakes up the next morning, and regrets having gotten too drunk to remember what happened the night before. Sugar tells Kim of the amazing sex she thinks she and Tom had the night before, before she gets a phone call from him. She is evidently over Guillaume. At Sugar's flat, Kim goes home annoyed and upset at the fact that Sugar picked Tom over her. Kim decides to plan a bit of revenge by kidnapping Tom's dog while he's in a shop. While Tom's looking for his dog, he gets a text message telling him to collect her at 8pm. She ties Vanessa, the dog, to a lamppost and then walks off, leaving her sitting by the side of the road.

Nathan is looking at some of Matt's drawings, and finds one of what is meant to be Stella, written underneath it is "Fucking whore". Nathan goes to Matt's bedroom, and obscenities and death wishes are written all over the walls in red paint. Matt has also painted himself red. Nathan gives Matt a bath to wash the paint off him, explaining to him that his mother isn't a whore.

Sugar and Kim are at the club, and Sugar tells Kim that Tom has cancelled on her at 7:55 pm. Tom arrives to where Vanessa was tied, but she has come free of her lead. She runs into the road, and is hit by several cars, killing her.

Sugar and Kim are at the pier, and she now remembers what really happened the night she was with Tom. Tom had ejaculated before they even got their clothes off. She says how if Kim could stand the premature ejaculations, she and Tom would probably be a good couple. Kim says she's not jealous, and says that Tom is definitely not her type. Sugar jokingly suggests perhaps she is more Kim's type, and Kim doesn't reject this claim. Sugar then realises that Kim has feelings for her, and Kim leaves abruptly. Sugar is left on her own to think as Kim walks through home through Brighton.

Episode 7 
Kim has stayed in her bedroom for a week after the events that occurred in Episode 6. Sugar has been calling her frequently, but Kim hasn't been answering the calls. Nathan comes into Kim's room, which is a mess, and he is under the impression that she isn't feeling well. Kim gets out of bed, and goes out to speak to Sugar.

Despite the fact that Sugar now knows that Kim is gay and that she fancies her, she's acting as though none of this has come out, which this worries Kim.

Sugar asks what lesbians do [sexually], but Kim doesn't actually know. Sugar asks how she knows she's gay if she's never had sex with a man, but Kim requests that they change the subject. Sugar tells Kim that she's done with men, and it's time she found other ways to enjoy herself. Later, when Sugar and Kim are sitting in deck chairs next to each other, Sugar puts out her hand, inviting Kim to hold it, and she does so.

Outside a nightclub, Sugar gives Kim half of an ecstasy tablet, she takes the other half. In the nightclub, they both dance with each other. When asked by a man if they are both lesbians, Sugar replies that they are. She then kisses Kim twice, the second more intimate than the first. Kim goes to the bar to order drinks for her and Sugar, and when she goes back to find her, she's making out with the man that asked if she was gay. Running outside, Kim is sick on the ground, and starts crying. She staggers down the road and finds her mother sitting on a bench.

Stella tells Kim that she got bored with Dale, and that he was only good for sex. Sitting in a taxi, going home, Kim reminds herself of the happy times she had with Sugar; with her mother almost unconscious on her shoulder.

Episode 8 
As Kim starts destroying and disposing of all the things that she has of Sugar's, Kim picks up a drinks can that Sugar had drunk out of, and puts her lips to it for a short moment before throwing it away.

Kim starts attending an ex-gay group at a church. It is here where she first meets Beth, a girl who is only at the ex-gay meetings so that she can meet other girls. Back at school, Kim sees Sugar, and in an attempt to block out her gay inhibitions, she keeps quoting, "Sugar is bad for me". One of the "steps" of the ex-gay program involves "hanging out with like-minded people", and it is while she is carrying this out that she falls for Beth. However, Kim suddenly gets worried that she is falling for girls that aren't Sugar, and decides to get drunk so that she might forget about things. She goes to the bar of the club, but doesn't get served because she is under-aged; so a man walks up and buys one for her. They get on, and the guy gropes Kim at every opportunity. In the toilets, in the same cubicle where Sugar and Kim drew on the wall, they get intimate and as Kim says "fuck", the guy interprets this as a request, and tries to pull his and her pants and underwear down. While this is happening, Kim starts to shake and cry as she looks at the feet drawn on the wall, and reminisces of when it happened. She starts sobbing, and the guy thinks it's his fault. Realising she's a virgin, and thinking this is why she's crying, he quickly leaves, reiterating the fact that he didn't do anything.

On the street, Tom runs up to Kim and says hi to her; Kim speaks to him, telling him about all her problems with Nathan and Stella. They reach Tom's front door, and he invites her in. They get drunk, and have sex, but during the ordeal, Kim is imagining it being with Sugar. Afterwards, Kim says that she has to leave so that she can do homework, and before she does, Tom thanks her.

In an attempt to be spontaneous, after something Stella said to him, Nathan prepares a dessert for her. After throwing it onto her, Stella and Nathan get intimate. They start to have sex on the table, but Stella starts to choke on cake that Nathan threw into her mouth. He tries to perform the Heimlich Maneuver, but he breaks a rib. Nathan dials 999 and asks for an ambulance.

Kim leaves Tom's house and sees an ambulance outside. As she runs towards it, she notices that her mother is being taken away, wearing an oxygen mask and covered in food. She goes inside and sees Matt on the table eating the rest of the dessert. When she goes up to her bedroom, she sees Sugar on her bed. Sugar says she brought a bottle of whiskey, but as Kim wasn't there, she drunk it. Sugar tells Kim that the kiss in the nightclub was no big deal, and that they were on E at the time. Kim tells her that it was a big deal to her, and Sugar starts to play up to what Kim wanted and expected of her, going as far as kissing her, before she leaves.

At the ex-gay group, Kim makes subtle flirts towards Beth as they all 'pray'.

Episode 9 
Stella, back from hospital, is in bed and relies on Nathan for everything she wants or needs that would involve moving. Tired of this, Nathan goes to Kim and asks if she can look after Matt while he's left Stella. Kim goes to a café. Beth, who is also there, sees Kim crying, and asks if she's alright. She sits with her, and she tells her about how Nathan's left Stella. Kim tells Beth that she's still wanting to have sex with Sugar. Beth tells Kim that she's only going to the Christian ex-gay classes to see who she might be able to pull. They then leave the café, walking around, and they see Tom. Tom thinks that he and Kim are a couple, and that she wants to be his girlfriend, but Kim tells him that she's gay. She then walks off with Beth, who says that Sugar is a waste of her time. Beth asks why Kim has only met one girl that she likes in the three months that she's lived in Brighton, and says that she should be taking advantage of what Brighton's famous for. She then points to the water and asks if Kim has had a swim in it yet, to which she replies no. Beth then grabs Kim by the hand and runs into the water with her, fully clothed. In "Lost Vegas", where Kim and Beth are drying their hair, Beth moves over to kiss Kim.

Tom is in his bed, upset about Kim. One of his dads comes into his room and asks if he is okay, and Tom tells him that he slept with her, and that she now has a girlfriend. He is devastated about this, as he says he loved her. Tom's dad tries to comfort him by saying that having slept with a lesbian is considered by some people to be an achievement.

Kim asks Beth why she can't meet somebody who likes her, and after a moment, she kisses Beth. Beth tells Kim that she should speak to Stella about her having come back home.

Kim tells Stella that she wants her to speak to Nathan, but Stella's trying to think of reasons why she shouldn't. Kim tells Stella that she's not a good mother, but she still wants her as long as she's with Nathan. Stella calls Nathan, and as Kim goes out later, she meets him on the doorstep. Nathan tells Stella that she's turned him into a man that he never wanted to be, and that he thinks Stella should leave. As Kim walks past Tom, he is smoking a cigarette and appears to have his own crew. He tells them that he 'had her and her girlfriend', to the amazement of the people around him. He then chokes on his cigarette, throws it away, hands his trombone to one of the people, and walks down the street, with them following him.

Kim and Beth meet at Brighton Pier, but as Kim walks up to Beth, her phone rings. It's Sugar, sounding upset and distressed, saying that she needs her. Viewers then see Sugar on the phone to Kim, covered in blood. Kim looks at Beth, and suddenly runs away to find Sugar, standing her up.

Episode 10 
Kim is on the beach looking for Sugar, shouting her name. She finds her on the ground, crying, covered in blood. Kim asks what happened, but Sugar tries to leave. Kim doesn't let her leave, so Sugar tells her that she stabbed somebody.

Now night, Sugar and Kim are walking through Brighton Pier, and Sugar asks how much money Kim has. Kim says she doesn't have a lot, so Sugar goes around stealing things from shops as she walks past, and unattended handbags. Kim tries to get Sugar to go to her house by telling her that she has money there. Sugar tells Kim that she's planning on going to London. He asks Kim if she wants to come, but then tells her to forget that she asked when she doesn't get an answer. When Kim gets home, Stella tells her that she and Nathan are getting a divorce. Kim goes to her bedroom and cries, but then wonders why she's staying to wait for Stella to leave when she can go to London with Sugar. She packs all of her essentials into a bag, and goes through her parents' things for money and things that she can sell, then leaves the house.

Sugar and Kim see a police car, and Sugar hides from it, scared. Sugar is paranoid and worried that there may be snipers on the roofs of buildings, and then tells Kim that they need to leave as soon as possible. They get on a bus, but don't know where they or the bus are going.

In a cafe, Sugar tells Kim what happened. She was having sex with a man at the beach, and when he finished, his friend tried to have sex with her. Sugar told him to stop, but he didn't, so she stabbed him with a glass bottle. Sugar then breaks down and asks why nobody truly falls in love with her. Kim asks if Sugar knows how to steal a car, and they then do so. Sugar hot wires it and they leave Brighton via the motorway. Kim asks if she can have a go at driving, and when she does, Sugar worries about the speed she's driving at. After trying to tell her to slow down, Kim loses control of the car. It doesn't crash, but Sugar starts screaming at Kim. Kim pulls over, and they both get out of the car. Sugar tells Kim to go back home, but Kim tells her that she doesn't have a home to go back to. She then goes on to say that Sugar is technically raped every time she has sex with somebody in an incredibly drunk state.

Sugar and Kim get back in the car, with Sugar in the driver's seat. Sugar tells Kim how she'll be successful, marrying another woman and living in a penthouse with a view of the New York skyline. Kim tells Sugar that she will also be successful, but Sugar disagrees with her, saying that when she gets out of prison, she'll be overweight and have a heroin addiction. Sugar then says that she wants a penthouse, if only for one night. Kim smiles at Sugar, and tells her to drive.

They arrive in London, and stop their car in front of an expensive hotel. In the penthouse suite, Kim and Sugar look out of the window looking at the London skyline, and later share a bath together, toasting Stella's credit card, as this is what they used to get into the hotel room. Sugar complains that the champagne is dry, and asks Kim to get some sugar for it. Kim says that sugar doesn't go in champagne, and Sugar replies by saying that a little bit of Sugar can go in anything. She then uses her foot to sexually arouse Kim, but Kim rejects her advances, saying not to do it if she doesn't mean it.

Sugar later asks Kim if she would rather be at the hotel with Beth, but Kim says she'd rather be with Sugar. Sugar then asks who is a better kisser out of herself and Beth, but Kim doesn't give her a straight answer. Kim then asks Sugar who she'd rather be with, if she could pick anybody in the world. She says she'd rather be with Brad Pitt, but Kim would do. Kim asks Sugar why, and then asks why Sugar called Kim. She says she knew Kim would come, and Kim then analyses the situation. She says that her life with Sugar would probably never change, with Kim always doing things for Sugar, but Sugar would never be able to repay her. Kim then walks to the window and cries at it. Sugar walks up to her and apologises. She then tries to kiss Kim, but is rejected. She says that she means it this time, and they kiss.

The next morning, Kim wakes up in bed with Sugar next to her. A police car pulls up in front of the hotel, and Stella and Nathan get out of it with two police officers, entering the hotel.

Series 2 (2006)

Episode 1 
The episode starts eighteen months after the events that took place in the last episode of the first series. Kim is back on the waltzer, but this time with two different girls. Back in reality, according to Kim, everything is back to normal; she is in bed with her electric toothbrush again, except this time it isn't working as well as it has done previously. Again, Kim is interrupted, but this time it is Stella. She asks if Kim wants her to buy her a Diva magazine or some K-Y Jelly. Clearly, Stella knows Kim is gay.

Stella is back with Nathan, and she is embracing monogamy. Kim, about to go out, is stopped by Nathan, who wants to know where she's going. From his attitude, he also knows that Kim is gay. Kim tells her father that she's going to meet Sugar who is now in a Young Offenders Institute. The reason Sugar is in prison, and Kim isn't, is because Sugar had been in prison previously, and she verbally assaulted the judge. Sugar is the last person Kim has had sex with, and she doesn't appreciate Kim waiting for her to come out, but Kim is struggling to find somebody that likes her for the right reasons.

Nathan and Stella are having relationship problems – Stella is desperate for sex, and not much else. It is because of this that Stella and Nathan have started sex therapy sessions. Much to Stella's disappointment, the sex therapy involves no sex.

Kim, walking around the Pier wondering about her relationship with Sugar and other women, bumps into another woman who is carrying a bag full of sex toys, that all fall out of the bag onto the ground. After Kim and the woman have picked them all up and put them back into the bag, the woman says it was nice bumping into Kim, and walks off. Kim follows the woman to a shop that she unlocks, that has written on the door, "Brighton's only women's sex shop". Kim decides to enter the shop, shocked by all the sex toys. When she's startled by the woman, she wants to ask her out, but cops out and instead picks up a pair of vibrating lovets, asking to buy them. Over several shop visits, she picks up a bottle of Liquid Silk; a wand; an "Easy Pleaser"; and a vibrating clit pump, where Kim is invited to buy two to receive free rechargeable batteries; each time meaning to ask the woman out. The shop owner eventually gives up and invites Kim to "The CC", which is short for "The Clit Club", and introduces herself as Saint.

When Kim later goes to the club, she meets Saint there, who enthusiastically welcomes her, asking her to buy a drink and speak to her in a while. When Kim sees Saint inviting others as enthusiastically as she did her, she realises she's not on a date with Saint, as she initially believed. At the bar, Kim meets another woman, who offers to buy Kim a drink. She introduces herself as Anna, and flirts with Kim, and Kim tells her that she is a journalist who recently returned from London. She asks Kim if she wants to go back to her place, and Kim accepts, much to the disappointment of Saint, who sees them leaving.

The next morning, Anna asks Kim to take the day off work, and Kim realises she was meant to finish an essay. After Anna realises that Kim isn't a journalist, she takes Kim home, but instead of leaving her there, she is invited in. Kim partially dresses up in her school uniform, much to the amusement of Anna. When Nathan and Stella get back home, they arrive to Kim across Anna's lap, being spanked by Anna.

Kim meets Anna at the club the next day, and also sees Saint, who tries to explain how she feels to her. When she reaches Anna, she sees that she has met another girl and is taking her to her house. Kim then goes back home and cries in her bedroom. Nathan takes Kim's washing to her room, then tells her that he may have overreacted when he saw her and Anna the day before.

Kim goes to prison the next day, and tells Sugar that Anna dumped her. Sugar tells Kim that she's jealous because Kim has a life, and all she has is Kim's prison visits. On Kim's way home, she again bumps into Saint. Saint tells her that she does like her, and gives her mobile number.

Episode 2 
Kim, in class, reads her essay out, but afterwards is told it isn't about the book she was supposed to read. As she walks back to her desk, the books on it drop off, and a girl called Melissa hands the napkin with Saint's phone number written on it to her. As Kim leaves the college, she checks her phone while Melissa unsuccessfully tries to flirt with her. Kim sees that it has been nine hours since she called Saint and left a message on her voicemail, but she has yet to receive a message back.

Kim visits Sugar in prison again, gives Sugar some drugs, and after Kim tells her that she called Saint so soon after getting her number, she tells Kim that she's a nutter. Kim later decides to send Saint a text if not call her, but when she's typed "Soz for fucking nut", she is startled by Melissa, who loudly announces her presence while standing behind the bench Kim is sitting on. This makes Kim press the send button, and the message as it is gets sent to Saint. Melissa tries to invite Kim to her house to write another essay for the book class.

In her bedroom, Kim wants to call Saint, but remembers telling Sugar that she wouldn't. Instead of calling, Kim goes to the club. Although Saint is the club DJ, she doesn't want to draw attention to her presence, as she doesn't want to come across as being a stalker. She meets Anna at the club, who thinks Kim is there because she can't get over the fact that she and her are over. Kim realises she's acting immature, so leaves. She finally receives a text message that says "Can't do Friday soz".

Kim goes back to prison, and gets told by Sugar that Kim should get another girlfriend to make Saint jealous. She suggests Melissa, so she invites Melissa to her house. On Sugar's advice, Kim tries to get her drunk, but Melissa tells her that she only drinks water after 6 p.m. Kim tries a different approach, and gets Melissa to change into a revealing red dress.

Kim and Melissa go to the club. Saint apologises for not being available on Friday, and Kim is shattered by the fact that she is now stuck with Melissa. Kim then finds a way to get rid of Melissa, by introducing Anna to her. She plays Melissa up to her, and eventually leaves Melissa to go back to Anna's house. After Saint thinks that Anna stole Melissa from her, she buys Kim a drink, tells her that she knew Melissa wasn't her girlfriend, and kisses her.

The next day, Sugar, about to be reprimanded by the "governor", seduces her and eventually sleeps with her. At Kim's class, Melissa tells Kim that they would be better off as friends.

Episode 3 
Kim is glad that her and Saint's relationship has lasted 48 hours, and they haven't had sex either, but she was worried about the idea of satisfying the woman that owns a sex shop. When invited for lunch at Saint's place, which is above the shop, Kim assumes Saint is inviting Kim round so that they can have sex, but Saint invites Kim to her place for lunch. They both sit down and watch television, Kim starts rubbing her hand down Saint's leg, and it eventually moves to the bedroom, where they have sex. Afterwards, Kim notices that Saint has a tattoo in the shape of a swastika.

Later, when Kim visits Sugar in prison, Sugar tells Kim that she's getting out of prison early, because she slept with one of the staff. Sugar asks Kim if she can live with her for a while, she has nowhere else to go – her mother is moving out of Brighton with a new boyfriend.

At the CC, Anna tries to put Kim off Saint by telling her that Saint still likes men, but Kim doesn't believe her. When she and Saint leave, Saint tells her that she needs to do something early in the morning, so she won't be able to see Kim. Kim is fine with this, and goes home.

Next morning, Kim goes to the prison and tells Sugar that she can stay at her house, but she wants to be picked up in a car. Kim then goes to Saint's, but a man opens the door to her. Kim wants to know why they're both semi-naked and wet, and hopes that what Anna said isn't true. Saint tells her that the man, Mark, is an old friend of hers that was fixing the boiler. When they are all out, Mark calls Saint Sarah, and Kim didn't know that was Saint's real name. Saint tells Kim that Mark is an ex-boyfriend, and that they were never serious, but Kim thinks she is lying about this after she sees he also has a tattoo the shape of a swastika. Saint then leaves Kim, telling her that it's unfair to call her friend to come to Brighton and then just leave him.

Stella and Nathan meet the new neighbours, who are moving into the house that Tom, Dave, and David lived in. Stella blatantly flirts with the Ted, one of them.

Later, at Saint's apartment, Kim gets a gift from Saint: a strap-on dildo. Kim is afraid that this might mean that Saint misses penetrative sex, and that this is a compromise she wants Kim to make. When Kim later gets out of bed wearing her underwear, she hears somebody in the kitchen and assumes it's Saint, but when she gets to the kitchen, she instead finds Mark, who says he is checking the boiler. When asked how he got in, he says he still has a set of keys. Kim gets dressed and goes down to the shop. She asks Saint if she's still sleeping with Mark, and she says no, but Kim doesn't believe her. She storms out of the shop and goes home to her bedroom. Saint soon knocks on the door and comes in, and they discuss the situation. They sort things out, but Sugar's social worker then comes. Saint hears as the social worker confirms that Sugar will be sleeping in Kim's room, and Saint then walks out, angered. She asks what the difference is between Saint having her ex-boyfriend at her flat, and Kim having her ex-girlfriend at her house. Kim can't give her an answer, so Saint then leaves.

Kim and Saint work things out, and as they get close, Kim realises that she's supposed to pick up Sugar, but decides to stay with Saint, leaving Sugar standing outside the prison, enraged.

Episode 4 
Sugar has now moved into Kim's house, and she is told that she's to sleep on an air bed. While Kim is asking if she wants it soft or hard, Nathan, who is walking past Kim's bedroom, assumes they're "getting re-acquainted", until she comes downstairs and asks where the pump for the airbed is.

Kim takes Sugar and Saint to the CC, and Sugar gets upset about the fact that she's already been surrounded by women for the last 18 months, and she leaves the bar. Saint says that Kim should go after her, which she does. They both then go back to Kim's house, and they go to sleep. The next day, Nathan and Stella are at the kitchen table, and Stella is looking through a swingers magazine. Nathan is trying to discuss buying a double-bed for Kim and Sugar, as he thinks they are a couple; and he takes the magazine from Stella so that he can get her attention. When he sees the magazine, he thinks Stella is ordering porn, but the magazine was addressed to the new neighbours – it was delivered to the wrong address. When Stella takes it back to the neighbours, Tom flirts with her when he asks if she looked at the pictures or read the magazine. He also asks if Stella and Nathan are available on the weekend, saying that he is having friends over. Stella assumes he is inviting them to his house, but he is asking if she can look after his daughter, as the babysitter he had arranged cancelled.

Sugar has a job at a candy floss stand; it was the only job she was able to get. During a break, Sugar tells Kim that she'd like to meet Saint again, having messed it up the first time. Kim doesn't mind at first, but she is killing their romance.

Saint asks Sugar to suggest a place where they could all go, and Sugar says she'd like to go anywhere where there'll be men. When they get to the club, Kim gets annoyed at the fact that she and Saint can't be alone together, so she decides to leave Sugar there. Saint says that she'll stay with Sugar, and that they'll have fun.

The next day, Kim goes to the candy floss stand, and finds out why business is so rife – Sugar is selling drugs. On Sugar's break, Kim tells Sugar that Saint felt bad for the night before, and Sugar tells her that Saint made a pass at her. When Kim later discusses this with Saint, she realises that Sugar was lying. Saint tells Kim to sort out the problems between herself and Sugar. When Kim asks Sugar why she lied, and why she wants to mess up the relationship she and Saint have, Sugar tells her that she the only person that she has, but she feels unwanted at Kim's house.

Nathan tells Stella that perhaps they should invite the new neighbours round so that they can have a rootfest.

The following morning, Kim wakes up to an empty bed, Sugar is at the beach. Kim calls her, asking her to come back. She says that her home is Sugar's home for as long as she may need it, but she hangs up and walks down the beach, with all her belongings packed into two small bags.

Episode 5 
Kim is walking around Brighton on the phone to Sugar's voicemail service. She goes to the candy floss stand to find her, but she isn't there. Kim finds a prostitute's advert card, written on it "Sugar Lips". Kim calls her again, asking her to call her back or at least get the hat she's holding. She hangs up, and looks in the hat, pulling out drugs. She throws them in a drawer, and goes to Saint's shop. Saint is packing stuff into a box, telling Kim that she's going to a business convention so that she can try and sell some of her merchandise.

Nathan and Stella prepare for the swingers party, but he is nervous about it.

Kim is doing homework on her computer, and decides to call Saint, but gets through to her voicemail. She then gets bad ideas about what Saint could be doing, so calls her again. She then hears loud music blaring out of a car outside her window, and looks outside. She sees Sugar and a man get out of a car, and she snogs him before going inside Kim's house. Sugar says that the man, Dmitri, took her to London, and that she couldn't call Kim. She also says that she's now living there, and is slyly looking for the drugs when she can't find them in the hat. Kim takes the drugs out of the drawer and throws them on the floor, asking if they are what Sugar is looking for. They row, and Kim tells Sugar that she won't visit her should she get imprisoned again, before she storms out of the house. Stella goes up to Kim's room and tries to give her a reason to leave the house, and offers to give her £20 if she stays out until midnight. Kim says she wants £50, so Stella hands her £50 and tells her to stay out until 1 a.m. After Stella leaves her bedroom, Kim looks on the floor and finds some of the tablets that fell out of the bag she threw on the floor earlier are still there.

Now she has nothing to do for the rest of the night, Kim goes to the CC, which has many women dressed as men. When she orders a drink for a bar, a woman, Montana ( Jemima Rooper), starts shouting at Kim, ecstatic that she's found another woman that isn't dressed as a man. Montana pours Kim a drink, and gives her an Access All Areas sticker so that she can meet up with her afterwards. She then gets on stage and starts singing ""You're Gorgeous". After the performance, Kim meets up with Montana backstage and starts flirting with her. Kim tells Montana that she has a girlfriend, but Montana tries to kiss her anyway. Eventually Kim reciprocates and the two begin to kiss, just as the camera angle pulls back to reveal Saint, who has witnessed the entire event. Saint walks away and goes home. Kim is sitting outside, holding a bottle of alcohol. She takes the pill out of her pocket and swallows it. She is unconscious when Sugar tries to call her, and Sugar leaves a message on her voicemail saying that the pills are dodgy, and that she should throw them away. Montana wakes Kim and takes her out of the club as she would like to go swimming in the sea, but Kim falls to the ground when Montana runs down the beach. She struggles to get back up, and staggers down the beach. She begins to hallucinate, seeing Sugar, Matt, Nathan, and Stella, culminating in a vision of Saint, who hits Kim over the head. All the visions have negative things to say about Kim and her life.

Sugar is trying to find Kim, but Dmitri tells her that if she doesn't go with him now, he will go home without her. Kim, still on the beach, calls Saint, but she doesn't pick up. Kim apologises, and starts telling her that she's sorry. She sings "You're Gorgeous" on the phone, and Saint picks up, telling her to "fuck off". Kim phones her again and continues singing, and Saint realises something is wrong. She asks where Kim is, or what she can see, and Kim replies that she is looking at the "wreck of loneliness"), and falls unconscious.

Kim regains consciousness in a hospital, and a nurse tells her that she is lucky that a friend brought her to the ED in time. When Kim asks who she is talking about, Sugar appears, and walks up to the bedside. She tells her that the drugs were horse tranquillisers, and Kim, assuming it was Sugar who took her to the hospital, thanks Sugar and tells her that she needs her in her life. Sugar receives a phone call from Dmitri, and tells Kim that she needs to go. Shortly after Sugar leaves, Nathan and Stella arrive. Kim realises that she has friends and family that care enough to visit her; with exception to Saint.

Viewers are then shown what happened during the time that Kim was unconscious. After the 'phone call from the delirious Kim, Saint quickly left her house and searched around Brighton, but couldn't find her. Saint then realised that Kim was near the West Pier, and found her there. She saw that Kim was unconscious, and called for an ambulance. On the phone, she told the operator that it was her girlfriend who was unconscious. Saint then went to the hospital with Kim, and tried to call Kim's parents, but got connected to the answering machine as they were having sex with the neighbours. Saint waited by Kim's bed throughout the night, and as the nurse came in in the morning, Saint left. As she left, she saw Sugar in the corridor outside Kim's room, telling her where she is.

Episode 6 
Now out of hospital, Kim feels terrible for betraying Saint's trust. Nathan and Stella feel that Kim needs counselling, so they pay for a session. Initially, Kim doesn't want to say anything, but eventually tells the counsellor about her problems. Just as Kim is getting into it, the session ends, and she has to leave. She goes home, and Sugar comes with her because Dmitri's family are staying at his flat for a while. Sugar and Kim go to the Pier, and they discuss Dmitri and Saint. Kim tells Sugar that she thinks she and Saint are over, telling her that she didn't even visit her in hospital. Kim then starts to wonder how Sugar found her, and Sugar tells her that she just knows her well. They then go to visit the Brighton Pier shops, and Sugar tells Kim that she was given money from Dmitri, and that she can buy Kim whatever she wants.

Meanwhile, Nathan goes to speak to Kim, and finds Matt in her room wearing lipstick and her underwear.

At the shops, while Sugar is buying plasters, Kim bumps into Saint. She tells Saint what happened as she knows it, unaware that Saint was there. Saint tries to tell Kim what really happened, but Sugar interrupts, asking for money. Kim then tells Saint that Sugar took her to the hospital, and Saint walks away.

Back at the counsellor, Kim says that she thinks she's lost Saint. The counsellor suggests to Kim that she tries to speak to Saint in private, going to her apartment. Kim goes there, but nobody is in, so she goes home.

Saint goes to Kim's house to speak to Kim, but Sugar answers the door. Saint and Sugar are hostile towards each other, and Saint asks when Sugar is planning on telling her that she took Kim to the hospital. Saint tells Sugar to ask Kim to call her, and gives Sugar a bag to give to Kim. Kim, still on her way home, decides to go to Saint's place the next day. When she gets home, Sugar gives her the bag. She doesn't give her the message, and says that Saint didn't leave one. Sugar and Kim share a bottle of vodka. Kim later cries in bed, thinking Saint doesn't want to see her. Kim says that she would have liked to at least remain friends. Sugar says that she doesn't understand, saying that men don't drop off a person's belongings and ask that they are called. Kim then asks Sugar what else she's lied about, and she lets slip that the first time she saw Kim was at the hospital, not at the West Pier. Kim asks who took her to hospital, and Sugar tells her. Sugar then tells Kim that she had no choice, that Dmitri's family aren't in the area, and that she stole the money from him.

Now Kim knows the truth, she runs to Saint's house, telling her that she now knows the truth. Saint tells Kim that it's late, trying to get her to leave before a random woman that Saint invited to her flat for casual sex arrives. Kim thinks that Saint has moved on, and leaves. As she leaves, she punches the woman that's standing outside. When she gets back home, she sees Sugar packing her bags again. Kim tells her that she can stay, despite the fact that she lies, uses her whenever it suits her, and gets jealous about everybody Kim gets close to.

Back at the counsellor's office, Kim says that she's learnt a lot about forgiveness.

Episode 7 
Kim sits in a prison cell, telling herself that crime of passion is a legitimate defence in France, referring to when she punched Saint's casual sex partner. The next morning, she tells the police officer that she'd punch the woman again, Saint enters and hears this Saint and Kim walk out, and Saint tells Kim that nobody has ever punched somebody for her before. They get in Saint's car to go to her apartment, and she takes her home.

Sugar, at Kim's house, is getting called by Dmitri, but she doesn't answer. She then gets a text message from him, asking where his money is.

Saint tells Sugar that she and Kim are back together. Dmitri then calls Kim's house phone, asking for the money. When Kim tells him that she isn't there, and he hangs up, he sends Sugar another text. Saint then tells Kim that she needs to pack up and go so that she can take Kim to Devil's Dyke, and Sugar offers to run Saint's shop for her. Saint reluctantly refuses, but eventually agrees.

At Devil's Dyke, Saint tells Kim that she loves her. Kim and Saint agree to be honest with each other about everything.

While Sugar is running the sex shop, Sugar gets constant text messages and phone calls from Dmitri, and when she finally answers one, she does so angrily. When Saint and Kim get back to the shop, they find it locked and closed in the middle of the day. Saint unlocks the door, and finds the cash register empty. Saint and Kim go to Kim's house, where they find Sugar, who explains that Dmitri came into the shop and took the money. Saint says that she needs the money to pay the rent the next day, and she wants to call the police. Sugar says that she can't because she hasn't been complying with the terms of her parole. They think of another way to get the money back, and execute their plan.

Sugar, talking to Dmitri at the CC and acting as though they are a couple, are approached by Saint, who is introduced to Dmitri by Sugar. Saint says that she's an old friend of Sugar's. Saint also says that she was in prison for extortion. Kim is dressed in black, waiting in a cubicle in the toilets. Saint spills alcohol over Dmitri, and steals his keys without him realising. Sugar goes into the toilets, and hands Kim the keys, telling her that she's looking for a shoebox in the wardrobe. Kim goes to Dmitri's flat and searches the flat for a wardrobe. At the club, Dmitri tells the women that he's going to the toilet, but instead leaves the club without telling them; the barkeep handing Sugar a large bill. Saint calls Kim, and she tells her that Dmitri is on her way home. Kim tells Saint that she doesn't have the money yet, and finds the wardrobe, only to open it finding heaps of shoe boxes. She finds the money, but then hears a car pull up outside. It is Dmitri and his dog. Dmitri realises he has lost his keys, but is let into the flat block by other people. Dmitri picks the lock to his front door, and Kim hides herself and the shoebox under Dmitri's bed.

Sugar and Saint arrive outside Dmitri's flat, and Saint flirts with him over the video intercom. She tells him that the money isn't important, and that she and Sugar arrived so that they could have a threesome. Dmitri lets them in, and Saint handcuffs Dmitri to the bed. Sugar wants to blindfold him, but he says no, saying he wants to see something otherwise they can leave. Sugar, reluctantly, kisses Saint. While Dmitri is now blindfolded, Kim gets out from under the bed and the three of them leave.

Sugar, Saint, and Kim later celebrate their triumph in the CC.

Episode 8 
Sugar and Kim arrive back at Kim's house drunk, and later wake up with hangovers. At breakfast, Kim tells Nathan that she's sorry for having had the alcohol because she was on antibiotics. Nathan and Stella are told that they have to pay a £400 GBP bill for Kim's counselling sessions. Later, at the dinner table, Nathan tells the family that he thinks the family should spend some quality time with each other. Kim asks if this can start tomorrow as she wants to go and see Saint.

Kim goes to the CC, entering with Sugar. Sugar meets Mark, and she thinks he is gay until he starts to flirt with her. He then walks away, and Sugar asks why he wouldn't be her type.

Nathan and Stella are looking through a new issue of the swingers magazine, and Nathan thinks they should stop swinging in the family home, much to Stella's disappointment. When Kim arrives home later than expected, Nathan tells her that they are a good family, and that they should start acting like one.

The next day, at Brighton Pier, Saint tells Kim that she wants to have sex with her in a boat. Sugar meets up with Mark, who takes her to the Brighton Pavilion. When Mark asks about Sugar's history, instead of telling him that she had been in prison, she tells him that she was studying.

At Kim's house the next day, she is shocked to hear that she didn't have sex with Mark, and is told by Sugar that he is okay with the fact that Sugar was in prison. Kim goes to Saint's shop and sees leaflets about an "adult playgroup", which is in fact a swingers party. She then invites Saint to dinner on Sunday at Kim's house.

Nathan tells Stella that they should go to the adult playgroup, and he phones to book two places for them. Stella later goes to Kim's room and tells Kim that she's worried about Matt. She asks Kim to stay with him, but she's made plans. Stella then tells her that she and Nathan are going to a marriage workshop, and Kim reluctantly agrees to look after Matt.

Mark is putting a sling up for the swingers group, and gets a text message from Sugar. He leaves what he was doing so that he can meet up with her, not properly inserting an important screw.

When Nathan and Stella leave, Kim splits the money Nathan gave her with Matt, and she leaves to meet Saint.

Sugar and Mark are walking around Brighton, and Sugar is showing Mark things that mean something to her: where she had her first kiss, her first "shag", and where she first met Kim. She then takes him down to the Pier, and shows him where she stabbed a man a year and a half ago, something she hadn't told him before. She then tells him about the car theft, credit fraud, and fleeing of a scene. She tells him that she wasn't studying, but was actually in prison, that she's living off her best friend, that she has no job, and that her mother left her and didn't tell her where she was going. She tells him that the only thing she has are her clothes and a big mouth. Sugar later thinks that Mark is staying with her to be polite, but he then kisses her.

Saint and Kim are at the CC when Saint gets a text message saying something is wrong. Kim asks if she can go with her, and Saint agrees, but says that Kim has to stay outside. Kim, waiting outside, gets bored of waiting, and finds an opportunity to sneak inside. She does so, and sees a lot of people wearing masks, kissing, and getting spanked. She goes up the stairs, and looks down, hearing a crash. She sees Nathan on the ground, moaning in pain – he was on the sling.

On Sunday, Saint attends the roast she was invited to, although everybody is acting awkwardly towards each other.

Episode 9 
Kim wakes up in Matt's coffin. She didn't sleep in her own bed because Mark and Sugar were in there. Kim goes to the Munch Box and moans to Saint about Sugar and Mark's relationship, but Saint is in a bad mood because she received the wrong stock delivery.

Kim goes back home, and Sugar tells Kim that they had sex in the disabled toilets of an art gallery. She also says that she's going out with him again, to a Russian play at a theatre, but Sugar is only going because it is sponsored by a vodka company, and because Mark has booked back seats. Stella tries to tell Kim something, but she doesn't want to hear it, thinking it's going to be about something related to her parents' swinging. Saint calls Kim, saying she needs a bit of head space.

Kim wakes up the next morning to Sugar telling her about everything Mark bought her the night before. Kim is concerned about the fact that Saint used the words "head space". Kim wants to go out with Sugar and get drunk, but Sugar is going out with Mark, so she is out on her own. Kim goes to Saint's flat so that she can speak to her, but Mark is there. Mark tells Kim that Saint gets a bit upset around the time of the anniversary of her mum's death, something she didn't tell Kim. Kim then leaves when Saint arrives.

The next day, Kim asks Sugar if she had fun with Mark, and she says she did. Kim tells Sugar that she knows Sugar is sleeping around, and that if she doesn't like Mark, she should just tell him. Sugar tells her that she was having a drink with Stella, and Mark met her later. Kim asks why Sugar was speaking with her mother, and she says that Stella just wanted to talk, but wanted to keep it a secret. Kim worries that Stella might have been "grooming" Sugar, preparing her for one of their swinger parties, but Sugar blurts out that Stella's pregnant, and that she tried to tell Kim herself before. Mark then sees her, and she goes to him.

Kim and Stella talk, and Stella is smoking. Kim asks if she should be smoking, and Stella puts the cigarette out. Kim asks her if she's told Nathan, and she says no. Kim then asks her if the baby is Nathan's, Stella tells her that Nathan is the only person allowed to not use protection when they have sex.

Saint goes to Kim's house, and they have sex in Kim's bed. Kim later tells her that she is jealous of the relationship that Sugar and Mark have. Saint guesses that Kim is upset about the fact that Saint didn't tell her about her mother. Saint gets out of bed, and Sugar enters the room. Sugar asks if they're finished, then tells her that she's worried because Mark wants her to meet his parents.

Stella tells Nathan that she's pregnant, and he thinks that she's joking. When he realises she's being serious, he tells her how they've already struggled with two children, and how he thought they were going to enjoy life. Stella gets annoyed with him, and tells him that she'll call an abortion clinic later.

At the dinner with Mark's parents, Sugar finds out that Mark hasn't discussed their relationship with his parents. They have a good opinion of Sugar until she says that she's been in prison. After Sugar and Mark leave the dinner, he tells her that he likes her and that they should be having fun. Sugar tells him that she doesn't like being told what to do, and that she thought she was in a serious relationship with somebody. She dumps him, and goes to Kim's house.

Saint tells Kim that since her mother's death, she's been good at bottling her feelings up, and that she isn't used to being in a relationship with somebody so close that she can rely on. They go back to Kim's bedroom, not realising that Sugar is sitting on her bed. Kim asks how the dinner went, and Sugar tells her that the dinner went downhill after she spoke of her conviction. Sugar tells Kim that she has made arrangements to stay somewhere else for the night, and that she'll be making permanent arrangements the next day.

Nathan and Stella later discuss the pregnancy, and Nathan tells Stella that if she wants the baby, he won't make her get an abortion.

Sugar climbs into Matt's coffin, this being the other arrangements she made.

Episode 10 
Saint suggests to Kim that she should move in with her above the shop. After first saying she will, as she thought that Saint was only suggesting she buy a desk so Kim could do her A-level work there sometimes, Kim becomes uncertain about her decision. She flips coins to try to give her an excuse not to take the plunge, but this search for an escape route is stymied every time. Meanwhile, Stella – now pregnant – realises she has a problem with smoking after noticing that she doesn't even realise she's doing it. Sugar, having moved out of Kim's parents' and working at a market stall, is looking for a well-paid job and goes to pole-dancing classes, but accidentally kicks the instructor in the face during a session. Sugar and Kim then visit the CC, and after egging each other on they both try a bit of pole-dancing there, but get thrown off by the club's resident dancers. Angered, Sugar throws a glass of beer at one of dancers, and she and Kim make a speedy retreat. They run into a doorway and Kim makes a sudden move on Sugar, snogging her. Kim pulls away, but then moves in again for another kiss. Sugar does not reject Kim's advances.

The following day Kim sees Saint – after trying to avoid her by hiding behind a wall – and they discuss the moving-in question. Kim again tries to find reasons for her not to move in by reminding Saint of her habits that Saint would find annoying, and Saint withdraws her offer in frustration and disappointment. After heading to Sugar's flat-warming party, to which she and Kim were invited earlier, Saint says that what she's looking for is somebody to share her life with, and that she's realised that Kim and she are at different stages in their lives and that Kim clearly just wants to have a good time. Saint goes home, leaving Kim to go to the party without her.

At the party, Kim is introduced to BamBam ("she clubbed her social worker over the head with a lamb chop"), the girl who supplied Sugar with the ketamine that put Kim in hospital. After Kim gets drunk, she proclaims loudly that Saint is no longer her girlfriend. BamBam, realising Kim is gay, starts to make a move on her but Kim is quickly taken away by Sugar, who seems determined that she and Saint should stay together. But as Kim and Sugar reminisce over chips in a café about the night they shared in the hotel (in the last episode of series 1), they wonder how things would have turned out between them if Sugar hadn't gone to prison. Sugar reiterates that Kim should be with Saint and that she and Kim would be better off as friends. But as Kim leaves, it is suddenly clear from Sugar's tears that there is part of her that wants to be with Kim.

Sure now of what she wants, Kim goes to Saint's place and, declaring her love for her, tells her that she does want to move in. As they kiss, they are interrupted by the door buzzer. Sugar arrives and announces that her flat has burned down, because somebody at the party put a cigarette in a bin. It is revealed to viewers that it was Kim who did this, though it is unclear if Kim herself realises. Sugar, now homeless, invites herself to live at Saint's flat for a while. The last shot is of Kim and Saint making up their minds whether to let her stay.

External links
 

Lists of British LGBT-related television series episodes
Lists of British teen drama television series episodes